Sidi Haneish Airfield  is an abandoned World War II military airfield complex in Egypt, in the western desert, about 376 km (235 miles) west-northwest of Cairo.

The airfield, known as Haggag el Qasaba by the German Luftwaffe, was the location of one of the most daring raids during World War II by the British Special Air Service (SAS). On the night of 26 July 1942, SAS Detachment "L", also known as "Stirling's Raiders", attacked the airfield, then under Luftwaffe control. Driving a convoy of eighteen jeeps, each carrying 3 or 4 British or French commandos, the raiders destroyed or damaged around forty Luftwaffe aircraft. The attack damaged the Luftwaffe's capability during the German invasion of Egypt and also, by the destruction of many transport aircraft, severely diminished its ability to re-supply German land forces in the field.

The airfield was later used by the United States Army Air Force Ninth Air Force during the Eastern Desert Campaign by the British Eighth Army, which the 57th Fighter Group, flew P-40 Warhawks from 8–12 November 1942.

It was apparently abandoned after the western desert campaign moved into Libya and eventually was taken over by the desert. Aerial photos show some evidence of where it existed.

British airfields
 The LG-12 (Landing Ground) North site is given as – ,
 The LG-13 South is given as – 
 The LG-101 is given as – 
 The LG-102 is given as –

See also

 Raid on Sidi Haneish Airfield
 List of World War II North Africa Airfields
 David Stirling
 Special Air Service
 No. 450 Squadron RAAF
 No. 601 Squadron RAF
 Second Battle of El Alamein
 559th Flying Training Squadron

References

 Maurer, Maurer. Air Force Combat Units of World War II. Maxwell AFB, Alabama: Office of Air Force History, 1983. .
 
 RAF Squadrons by C. G. Jefford.  (page 133 airfield locations)

Further reading

  Lists several airfields in the area.

External links
 Possible site of the airfield on Wikimapia

Airfields of the United States Army Air Forces in Egypt
World War II airfields in Egypt
Defunct airports in Egypt
Airports established in 1941